Cannabichromenic acid (CBCA) is minor cannabinoid and precursor of cannabichromene.

Biosynthesis 
Geranyl pyrophosphate and olivetolic acid combine to produce cannabigerolic acid (CBGA; the sole intermediate for all other phytocannabinoids). The enzyme CBCA synthase can cyclize either cannabigerolic acid or cannabinerolic acid (the Z isomer of CBGA) to form CBCA.

See also 
 Cannabielsoin
 Cannabisin F

References 

Cannabinoids
Benzopyrans